The white-winged potoo (Nyctibius leucopterus) is a species of bird in the family Nyctibiidae. It is found in Brazil, French Guiana, Guyana, Peru, Suriname, and Venezuela.

Taxonomy and systematics

For a time the Andean potoo (Nyctibius maculosus) was considered a subspecies of the white-winged potoo, but size, plumage, voice, and elevational distribution differentiate them. Those two species, the northern potoo (N. jamaicensis), and the common potoo (N. griseus) are more closely related to each other than to the other potoos. The white-winged potoo is (as of 2021) considered to be monotypic, but the Amazonian form might be a species in its own right.

Description

The white-winged potoo has two forms that differ significantly in size but are almost identical otherwise. The Amazonian form weighs ; it is much smaller than the eastern one though the latter's weight has not been documented. Both forms are dark brown above and lighter brown below, and both parts have darker speckles. The large white patch on the secondary wing coverts give the species its name.

Distribution and habitat

The Amazonian form of white-winged potoo is known from scattered sites in the Amazon basin of Eastern Venezuela, eastern Peru, the Guianas, and northern Brazil, though it probably occurs throughout the region. The eastern form has a much smaller range in Brazil's Bahia and Espírito Santo states. In Amazonia it inhabits the canopy of mature terra firme rainforest. The eastern form is not well known but is assumed to inhabit the canopy of the Atlantic Forest.

Behavior

Feeding

The white-winged potoo is nocturnal. It captures its insect prey by sallying from an exposed perch.

Breeding

The white-winged potoo's breeding phenology is unknown. It is assumed to lay one egg on a branch high in the canopy in a manner similar to that of other potoos.

Vocalization

The song of the Amazonian form of white-winged potoo is "a gradually descending, pure-toned 'feeeoooooo'" described as haunting and melancholy. It also makes a soft "bweep" call.

Status

The IUCN has assessed the white-winged potoo as being of Least Concern, though its population is unknown and thought to be decreasing. In Amazonia, "the biggest threat comes from continued destruction of pristine forest."

References

External links
Graphic; Article ao.com.br

white-winged potoo
Birds of the Amazon Basin
Birds of the Guianas
Birds of the Atlantic Forest
Birds of the Peruvian Amazon
white-winged potoo
Taxonomy articles created by Polbot